Pomacancha (from Quechua Puma Kancha, meaning "puma corral") is one of thirty-four districts of the Jauja Province in Peru.

Geography 
Other mountains are listed below:

References